Cahervagliar  is a ringfort (rath) and National Monument (#233) located in County Cork, Ireland.

Location

Cahervagliar is located 5.3 km km (3.3 mi) south-southeast of Kilmichael.

History and description
Cahervagliar is a bivallate ringfort,  in diameter with a lintelled stone entrance to the east. The name means "stone ringfort of sons of Lóegaire"; it was the fortress of the Cenél Lóegairi, kings in central Ireland. However, they did not build the fort, as they did not arrive until after 1172.

Ringforts of this type were mostly built c. AD 550–900. Internally people were housed in wooden huts. Local lore claims that Brian Boru was once held hostage here.

References

Archaeological sites in County Cork
National Monuments in County Cork